Mimica Pavlović (born 1 March 1984) is a Serbian football defender, currently playing for Krka Novo Mesto in the Slovenian League. She has also played for Keynsham Town in the English third level and ZFK Crvena Zvezda in the Serbian First League. She has been a member of the Serbia women's national football team.

References 

1984 births
Living people
Serbian women's footballers
Serbia women's international footballers
Expatriate women's footballers in England
Expatriate women's footballers in Slovenia
Women's association football defenders
FA Women's National League players
Keynsham Town L.F.C. players
Serbian expatriate sportspeople in England
ŽNK Krka players
ŽFK Crvena zvezda players
Serbian expatriate sportspeople in Slovenia